The 2021 Hungarian Athletics Championships was the 126th edition of the national championship in outdoor track and field for athletes in Hungary. It was held between 26 and 27 June at the Gyulai István Athletic Stadium in Debrecen.

Results 
Source:

Men

Women

References

External links 
 Hungarian Athletics Association website 

Hungarian Athletics Championships
Hungarian Athletics Championships
Athletics Championships
Sport in Debrecen
June 2021 sports events in Hungary